Ranjit Singh Chautala is a politician and businessman from the Indian state of Haryana. Elected to the Haryana Legislative Assembly and the Rajya Sabha, he has also served in ministerial posts. Previously a member of the Indian National Lok Dal, the Janata Dal, the Indian National Congress and the Bharatiya Janata Party, he won the seat of Rania in the 2019 Haryana Assembly elections as an independent. Following the election, along with his grandnephew Dushyant Chautala, he supported the BJP to secure a majority and entered the Second Manohar Lal Khattar ministry with three portfolios: New and Renewable Energy, Power and Jails.

Family
Ranjit Singh is son of Chaudhary Devi Lal Chautala who served twice as the former Deputy Prime Minister of India. He belongs to a very powerful family who participated in freedom struggle of India. Ranjit Singh's uncle Sahib Ram Sihag was a member of assembly in 1937 and 1946 and his father Devi Lal in Politics since 1951.

Career
In 1987 he was elected as the MLA of 7th Assembly from Rori Vidhan Sabha on Lok Dal ticket. He also served as agriculture minister of Haryana and his father was Chief Minister. In 1990 he was elected as Member of Parliament, Rajya Sabha from Haryana and his father Ch Devi Lal was Deputy Prime Minister of India at that time. He was the Deputy Chairman of State planning board, Haryana in 2005 - 2009. In 2019 he contested Haryana's 14th assembly from Rania Vidhan sabha and won as Independent MLA and became the minister.

See also 

 Political families of Haryana

References

Haryana MLAs 2019–2024
People from Sirsa, Haryana
Haryana MLAs 1987–1991
1945 births
Living people